The 1st Guards Infantry Division was an infantry formation of the Russian Imperial Army which was part of the Imperial Guard. It was headquartered in Saint Petersburg and was part of the Guards Corps. It took part in fighting against Napoleonic invasion of Russia in 1811 shortly after its formation. It was expanded in July 1914 upon the mobilization of the Russian Imperial Army, and took part in fighting on the Eastern Front of World War I. The division was demobilized in 1918 after the Russian Revolution.

History
The unit was initially formed on 15 June 1807 as the 1st Infantry Division. It was renamed "Guards" Infantry Division on 11 November 1811. For most of its history it was stationed in St Petersburg and was part of the Petersburg Military District upon its creation.

Order of battle upon formation
When it was founded in 1807 the unit consisted of the following:
Preobrazhensky Regiment
Semyonovsky Regiment
Izmaylovsky Regiment
Egersky Regiment

In 1811 it was expanded and grew to include:
1st Brigade
Preobrazhensky Leib Guard Regiment
Semyonovsky Leib Guard Regiment
2nd Brigade
Izmaylovsky Leib Guard Regiment
Lithuanian Leib Guard Regiment
3rd Brigade
Egersky Leib Guard Regiment
Finnish Leib Guard Regiment

Order of battle in 1914
From the early 1900s to 1917 the division consisted of the following:
1st Brigade
Preobrazhensky Leib Guard Regiment
Semyonovsky Leib Guard Regiment
2nd Brigade
Izmaylovsky Leib Guard Regiment
Egersky Leib Guard Regiment
1st Life Guards Artillery Brigade

Known officer staff

Commanders 
The list is incomplete.

Chiefs of staff 
This list is incomplete.

References

Books
 

Infantry divisions of the Russian Empire 
Military units and formations established in 1807
Military units and formations disestablished in 1918
Russian Imperial Guard
Divisions of World War I